

S

S